Mercury General Corporation is a multiple-line insurance organization offering personal automobile, homeowners, renters and business insurance. Founded in 1961 and headquartered in Los Angeles, Mercury has assets in excess of $4 billion, employs 4,500 people and has more than 8,000 independent agents in 11 states (Arizona, California, Florida, Georgia, Illinois, Nevada, New Jersey, New York, Oklahoma, Texas and Virginia).

Mercury's primary focus is automobiles and homeowners insurance, however, the company also writes personal liability policies (umbrella), business insurance, mechanical breakdown protection (similar to an extended warranty for your vehicle), renters, service line protection, home systems protection, identity management protection and ride-hailing insurance.

History 

Mercury founder George Joseph, who flew 50 World War II missions over Africa and Italy as a navigator before graduating from Harvard on the GI Bill in 1949, decided his Ivy League math degree fit nicely into the actuarial world of insurance. Joseph then spent more than a decade in the industry before founding Mercury Insurance in 1961 as a low-cost alternative to larger insurance companies.

Mercury General Corp., which consisted of six employees sold its first policy April 1, 1962. Now, it's one of California's largest insurance providers in the state.

Mercury's California expansion began in 1964 with the opening of its first Orange County office. Two years later, the company spread into the San Fernando Valley and also began operations in San Diego. Mercury offices opened in Northern California by 1968.

Mercury wrote $1 million in premiums per month by 1970, sold its first homeowners policy in 1972 and in 1973 the company celebrated its 10th consecutive year of revenue growth. Newly created Mercury Insurance Company wrote its first auto policy in 1977.

Mercury expanded outside of California, opening offices in Georgia and Illinois beginning in 1989.

The company insured more than 1 million vehicles in California by 1998. This led to further growth into Florida (1998), New York (2001) and Virginia (2001).

Forbes lists Mercury Insurance on its “100 Most Trustworthy Companies” in 2012 “America’s 50 Most Trusted Financial Companies” in 2014, 2015 and 2016. It has been rated A “Excellent” by insurance industry rating agencies A.M. Best and Fitch.

In 2017, the company was named a “Top Five Best Auto Insurance Company” by Insure.com, who surveyed more than 3,700 U.S. insurance customers on the criteria of “customer service,” “claims handling,” “pricing,” “plans to renew current policy,” and “would recommend the insurer.” Additionally, Mercury Insurance was named one of “America’s Best Midsize Employers” by Forbes magazine in 2017.

Mercury is currently operating in 11 states: Arizona, California, Florida, Georgia, Illinois, Nevada, New Jersey, New York, Oklahoma, Texas and Virginia.

Mercury is led by president and CEO Gabriel Tirador, and Joseph is chairman of the board.

Products 

Personal Auto Insurance – Mercury provides liability, collision, comprehensive, medical, Personal Injury Protection, Uninsured/Underinsured Motorist, Rental Car Reimbursement, and Roadside Assistance.

Homeowners Insurance – A policy specifically tailored to individual needs for single-family homes that includes the structure, belongings and liability coverage. It may also provide additional living expenses if policyholders are forced to vacate their homes due to a covered loss or peril.

Renters Insurance – Renters insurance provides coverage for personal property and liability protection. It also covers temporary living expenses should your property become uninhabitable due to a covered loss or peril.

Condo Insurance – Specifically designed for condo owners, these policies provide coverage for personal property, liability protection, guest medical protection, and condo unit additions and alterations.  It also covers temporary living expenses should your property become uninhabitable due to a covered loss or peril.

Umbrella Insurance – Additional liability protection for personal auto and/or homeowners in the event losses exceed the underlying policy's liability limits.

Dwelling Fire Insurance – A policy specifically designed for landlords to protect rental properties – providing coverage for the structure, contents and general liability. Should the property become uninhabitable due to a covered loss or peril, fair rental value will be provided for lost rents until the property is livable again.

Business Auto Insurance – Provides protection for individuals, sole proprietorships, partnerships and corporations with vehicles that are used for business purposes.

Business Insurance – Three different policies – Business Owners Policies (BOPs), Commercial Property, and Commercial Liability – that protect various aspects of a business. The most common policy coverages include liability, medical, building coverage, business personal property and business income.

Mechanical Protection – Commonly referred to as extended warranty coverage, Mercury's mechanical protection pays for covered vehicle repairs after the vehicle manufacturer's warranty expires. Certain benefits are also available during the vehicle manufacturer's warranty period.

Ride-Hailing Insurance – An endorsement to Mercury's personal auto policy that covers the gaps between auto insurance and the Transportation Network Company's commercial insurance coverage when the driver working for a TNC turns on the ride-hailing app.

Service Line Protection – An endorsement to a homeowners policy that covers damage to exterior underground service lines, which includes water piping, sewer lines, power lines and more.

Home Systems Protection – An endorsement to a homeowners policy that covers HVAC systems, appliances, electronics and more.

Identity Management Protection – An endorsement to a homeowners, condo or renters policy that help protect a person's identity from fraudsters.

Mercury Insurance Blog 

Mercury Insurance helps educate consumers about insurance by publishing insurance articles on its blog.  These articles discuss a variety of topics, including: how insurance protects homeowners, renters and their property, how to save money and reduce debt through proper budgeting; insurance considerations surrounding weather events; how to prepare for and handle natural disasters; insurance claim tips; advice on finding the best insurance deals and coverage options; tips on how to protect personal property while away on extended trips; and articles promoting financial literacy.  The blog also features lifestyle pieces, covering subjects such as travel, technology, parenting and teen driving.

Driver Safety Program 

Mercury Insurance created the Drive Safe Challenge in 2016 to help promote teen driver safety. What began as a collaboration between Mercury Insurance, the Anaheim Ducks and the California Highway Patrol in Anaheim, has since expanded to Florida through a partnership with the Tampa Bay Lightning and Tampa Police Department. The program has also been broadened to include mature drivers 55 and older to help sharpen their driving skills.

The Drive Safe Challenge includes an interactive classroom session and behind-the-wheel training to teach drivers of all ages the necessary skills to help them stay safe on the road. Participants learn collision avoidance tactics, car-handling, maneuvering on slippery surfaces, emergency braking maneuvers and more.

Mercury has also developed a free online extension that includes a variety of interactive tools, quizzes, driving safety information and discussion topics to help parents prepare their teens for life behind the wheel. Visit https://drivesafe.mercuryinsurance.com/ to learn more.

See also 

 List of United States insurance companies

References

External links 

Companies listed on the New York Stock Exchange
Insurance companies of the United States
American companies established in 1961
Financial services companies established in 1961
Companies based in Los Angeles
Auto insurance in the United States